James Mayer (1920–1944) was a Mauritian secret agent during World War II.

See also
SOE F Section timeline

References

1920 births
1944 deaths
Mauritian people of British descent
History of Mauritius
Mauritian military personnel of World War II
Mauritian spies
World War II spies
British Army personnel of World War II
British Army General List officers
Special Operations Executive personnel killed in World War II